The Intern Group is a provider of international internship programs in Bangkok, Tokyo, Toronto, Shanghai,  Dublin, Santiago, Chile, London, Hong Kong, Melbourne, Australia, Medellin, Colombia, Madrid, Barcelona, New York City, and Los Angeles. The organization offers both, in-person and virtual international internships in career fields related to architecture, business, fashion, law, social work, psychology, journalism, engineering, and more.

History 
The company was founded and keeps its head office in London. It has offices in New York, Melbourne, Madrid, Hong Kong, Colombia and also Santiago, Chile.

External links 
 Company website

References 

Companies based in the London Borough of Islington
Companies established in 2011
International economic organizations
Internships